Court Hill is a 10.45 hectare geological Site of Special Scientific Interest near the town of Clevedon, North Somerset, England, notified in 1997.

Pleistocene
Court Hill is a Geological Conservation Review Site because it is the only example in southern England of an ice-marginal col-gully cut by glacial meltwater and infilled by a variety of glacial sediments. The Pleistocene deposits include gravels, boulder-beds, sands, and till, overlain by cover sands with erratics of flint and Greensand chert.

It has also yielded a number of Jurassic and Cretaceous foraminifera (micro fossils).

Manor house
Clevedon Court is a manor house on the side of Court Hill, dating from the early 14th century. It is owned by the National Trust and has been designated by English Heritage as a Grade I listed building.

References

Sites of Special Scientific Interest in Avon
Sites of Special Scientific Interest notified in 1997
Clevedon